A Portrait may refer to:

 A Portrait (Voice of the Beehive album)
 A Portrait (John Denver album)

See also
 Portrait (disambiguation)